Baniana relapsa is a species of moth of the family Erebidae. It is found on the Antilles.

Adults are sexually dimorphic.

References

Moths described in 1858
Erebidae